Craig Doyle (born 1988) is an Irish hurler who plays as a full-forward for the Carlow senior team.

Born in Bagenalstown, County Carlow, Doyle first played competitive hurling whilst at school in the Presentation De La Salle College. He arrived on the inter-county scene at the age of sixteen when he first linked up with the Carlow minor team, before later lining out with the under-21 side. He made his senior debut in the 2007 Christy Ring Cup. Doyle has been a regular fixture on team since that initial appearance, and has won two Christy Ring Cup medals and one National League (Division 2A) medal.

Doyle represented the Ireland national hurling team on a number of occasions, winning his sole Composite rules shinty–hurling medal in 2011. At club level he is a Leinster medallist in the junior grade with Erin's Own.

Honours

Team
Erin's Own
Leinster Junior Club Hurling Championship (1): 2005
Carlow Intermediate Hurling Championship (1): 2005

Carlow
Christy Ring Cup (2): 2008, 2009
National Hurling League (Division 2A) (1): 2012
All-Ireland Minor B Hurling Championship (2): 2004, 2005

Ireland
Composite rules shinty–hurling (1): 2011

References

1988 births
Living people
Erin's Own (Carlow) hurlers
Carlow inter-county hurlers
Ireland international hurlers